Montigny-en-Morvan is a commune in the Nièvre department in central France.

Demographics
On 1 January 2019, the estimated population was 281.

See also
Communes of the Nièvre department
Parc naturel régional du Morvan

References

External links
 Official web for Montigny-en-Morvan

Communes of Nièvre